Nauvoo-Colusa Community Unit School District 325 is a school district headquartered in Appanoose Township, just east of Nauvoo, Illinois. It serves northwestern Hancock County, including the city of Nauvoo and the unincorporated community of Colusa.

It operates Nauvoo–Colusa Elementary School and Nauvoo–Colusa Junior High School. High school-aged students attend Warsaw High School, operated by Warsaw Community Unit School District 316.

History
In 2001 Dallas City High School in Dallas City closed. The Dallas City area was reassigned to Nauvoo-Colusa for high school, so that year 70 students and all but two of the Dallas City High teachers moved to Nauvoo-Colusa High School. The school's enrollment increased to 180 from 111, and all of the classrooms used as storage became active classrooms. The Dallas City district donated equipment to the Nauvoo-Colusa high school.

In 2007 the Nauvoo-Colusa school district and the Warsaw Community Unit School District 316 agreed to a plan in which Nauvoo-Colusa would close its high school and send its students to Warsaw High School. In return the Warsaw district would close its junior high school and send its students to Nauvoo-Colusa Junior High School. On Tuesday February 12, 2008 voters in both districts approved the deactivation plans. High school students attended Nauvoo-Colusa High School from 1961 to 2008.

Athletics
Nauvoo-Colusa's Junior High School athletics participate in the Hancock County Conference and are members of the Illinois Elementary School Association.

Boys
Baseball
Basketball
Track

Girls
Basketball- 
Track
Volleyball

Notable team state finishes
Boys basketball: High School A 1997–98 (1st), 8th Grade A 1995 (1st), 7th Grade A 1993 (4th), 8th Grade A 1996 (4th)
Girls basketball: West Hancock Coop State Champions 2A 2008, West Hancock Coop Runner-up 2A 2009, 8th Grade 2A 2021 (2nd)

See also
List of school districts in Illinois

References

Further reading
Former Superintendents:
Richard Heisler,
Terry Bethel,
Kenneth Nudd

External links
 Nauvoo-Colusa Community Unit School District 325

Education in Hancock County, Illinois
School districts in Illinois
1961 establishments in Illinois
School districts established in 1961